Santiago Tulantepec is a town in Mexico that is the municipal seat of Tulantepec de Lugo Guerrero, in the state of Hidalgo..

References

Populated places in Hidalgo (state)